Raymond Scorer Smith (14 April 1929 – 21 June 2017) was an English footballer who played as a wing half in the Football League for Luton Town and Southend United. He also played non-league football for Evenwood Town and Hastings United.

References

1929 births
2017 deaths
Footballers from County Durham
English footballers
Association football wing halves
Spennymoor Town F.C. players
Luton Town F.C. players
Southend United F.C. players
Hastings United F.C. (1948) players
English Football League players